Fratricide (German: Brudermord) is a 1922 German silent drama film directed by Wolfgang Neff and starring Lilly Flohr, Willy Kaiser-Heyl and Robert Scholz.

The film's sets were designed by the art director Mathieu Oostermann.

Cast
 Victor Colani
 Lilly Flohr
 Willy Kaiser-Heyl as Professor Vanhagen 
 Martha Orlanda
 Robert Scholz as Dr. Harry Kellerburg

References

Bibliography
 Grange, William. Cultural Chronicle of the Weimar Republic. Scarecrow Press, 2008.

External links

1922 films
Films of the Weimar Republic
Films directed by Wolfgang Neff
German silent feature films
German black-and-white films
1922 drama films
German drama films
Silent drama films
1920s German films
1920s German-language films